Lenni may refer to:

 Lenni, Pennsylvania, an unincorporated community in Middletown Township, Delaware County, Pennsylvania
 Lenni station, abandoned train station of Lenni
 Lenni Brenner (born 1937), American Marxist writer
 Lenni Jabour, Canadian singer-songwriter based in France
 Nanticoke Lenni-Lenape People (Nanticoke Lenape Indians), a tribal confederation
 Yang Jeongin, a member of the K-Pop group Stray Kids